"It Won't Be Long" is a song by the English rock band the Beatles, released as the opening track on their second UK album With the Beatles (1963), and was the first original song recorded for it. Although credited to Lennon–McCartney, it was primarily a composition by  John Lennon, with Paul McCartney assisting with the lyrics and arrangement.

Composition
John Lennon claimed this song in 1971 and 1980. In about 1995 Paul McCartney described the song as dominated by John, but written in collaboration. “John mainly sang it so I expect that it was his original idea but we both sat down and wrote it together." The chorus is a play on the words "be long" and "belong". The song features early Beatles trademarks such as call-and-response yeah-yeahs and scaling guitar riffs. Typical also of this phase of Beatles songwriting is the melodramatic ending (similar to "She Loves You", which had just been recorded and was about to be released) where the music stops, allowing Lennon a brief solo vocal improvisation before the song finishes on a "barber shop" major seventh ("She Loves You" ends on a major sixth). The middle eight uses chromatically descending chords over which Lennon, McCartney and Harrison sing in counterpoint.

John Lennon, in his final interview, told Playboy magazine that the song was the beginning of a wider audience for Beatles music than the youthful throngs that had fervently followed them from their Liverpool clubbing days. "It was only after a critic for the [London] Times said we put 'Aeolian cadences' in 'It Won't Be Long' that the middle classes started listening to us. ... To this day, I have no idea what 'Aeolian cadences' are. They sound like exotic birds." In fact, the critic, William Mann, had written this about the song "Not a Second Time." Rolling Stone stated that "It Won't Be Long" was "the kind of song Bob Dylan had in mind when he wrote that Beatles chords were 'outrageous, just outrageous.'" With its composers not being versed in musical theory, the song incorporates chords it "shouldn't", being in the key of E but veering off into D, C and F♯, and "a hybrid of D and Bm".

Recording and release
The Beatles recorded this song on 30 July 1963 in two sessions. The first session was in the morning, where they recorded 10 takes. The second session was in the afternoon, where they recorded seven more takes. The final product was a combination of takes 17 and 21, put together on 21 August.

The original release in the UK was on With the Beatles, 22 November 1963. In the US, "It Won't Be Long" first appeared on Meet the Beatles!, released 20 January 1964.

The song was never performed live or at any of the group's BBC sessions, although they did lip-synch to the track on an edition of Ready Steady Go! in March 1964.

Personnel
According to Ian MacDonald:
 John Lennon – double-tracked vocal, rhythm guitar
 Paul McCartney – backing vocal, bass
 George Harrison – backing vocal, lead guitar
 Ringo Starr – drums
 George Martin – producer
 Norman Smith – engineer

Covers
 The song is performed by Evan Rachel Wood in the 2007 film Across the Universe.

Notes

References

 
 
 
 
 

The Beatles songs
Song recordings produced by George Martin
Songs written by Lennon–McCartney
1963 songs
Songs published by Northern Songs